Mustafa Mujezinović (27 December 1954 – 23 December 2019) was a Bosnian politician who served as the 7th Prime Minister of the Federation of Bosnia and Herzegovina, one of the two entities of Bosnia and Herzegovina, from 2009 to 2011. In Sarajevo, he finished elementary school in 1970, and high school in 1974. He graduated from the Faculty of Electrical Engineering, University of Sarajevo in 1978.

Career
From 1978 to 1983, he was a designer, and then an engineer of quality in the factory of transformers and distribution facilities TTS, Energoinvest Sarajevo. From 1983 to 1990, he was a manager of technical sales group in the factory TTS, Energoinvest Sarajevo. From 1990 until 1992, he worked as a sales manager and member of the management board of the factory TTS, Energoinvest Sarajevo.

From 1994 to 1995, he was president of the municipality Stari Grad in Sarajevo, and, from 1995 to 1996, Mayor of the municipality Stari Grad in Sarajevo. From 1996 to 1998, he was the Prime Minister of Sarajevo Canton, and from 1998 to 2000, Governor of the Sarajevo Canton. From 2000 to 2001, he served as Ambassador of Bosnia and Herzegovina to the Organization for Security and Co-operation in Europe. From 2002 to 2004, he was director of the privatization fund "Prevent Invest".
From 2004 to 2008, he served as Ambassador of Bosnia and Herzegovina in Malaysia.

Since 2008, he worked as an adviser to the Board of the Development Bank of the Federation of Bosnia and Herzegovina.

He served as Prime Minister of the Federation of Bosnia and Herzegovina from 2009 to 2011.

References

External links

1954 births
2019 deaths
Politicians from Sarajevo
Bosniaks of Bosnia and Herzegovina
Bosnia and Herzegovina Muslims
University of Sarajevo alumni
Ambassadors of Bosnia and Herzegovina to Malaysia
Party of Democratic Action politicians
Prime ministers of the Federation of Bosnia and Herzegovina